Arionești is a village in Dondușeni District, Moldova.

Notable people
 Victor Pușcaș

References

External links
 Sit dedicat satului Arionești

Villages of Dondușeni District
Populated places on the Dniester
Soroksky Uyezd